Ana Mendieta (November 18, 1948 – September 8, 1985) was a Cuban-American performance artist, sculptor, painter, and video artist who is best known for her "earth-body" artwork. She is considered one of the most influential Cuban-American artists of the post-World War II era. Born in Havana, Mendieta left for the United States in 1961.

Early life and exile
Mendieta was born on November 18, 1948, in Havana, Cuba, to a wealthy family prominent in the country's politics and society. Her father, Ignacio Alberto Mendieta de Lizáur, was an attorney and the nephew of Carlos Mendieta, who was installed as president by Fulgencio Batista for just under two years. Her mother, Raquel Oti de Rojas, was a chemist, a researcher, and the granddaughter of Carlos Maria de Rojas, a sugar mill owner celebrated for his role in the war against Spain for Cuban independence. Ana, aged 12, and her 15-year-old sister Raquelin were sent to the United States by their parents to live in Dubuque, Iowa through Operation Peter Pan, a collaborative program run by the US government and the Catholic Charities for Cuban children to flee Fidel Castro's government. Ana and Raquelin were among 14,000 children who migrated to the United States through this program in 1961. The sisters were able to stay together during this time due to a power of attorney signed by their parents, which mandated that they not be separated. The two sisters spent their first weeks in refugee camps, and then moved between several institutions and foster homes throughout Iowa. In 1966, Mendieta was reunited with her mother and younger brother. Her father joined them in 1979, having spent 18 years in a political prison in Cuba for his involvement in the Bay of Pigs invasion.

Education
In Cuba, Mendieta grew up as a sheltered, upper-class child. She attended an all-girls Catholic private school. When she and her sister were sent to Iowa, they were enrolled in a reform school because the court wanted to avoid sending them to a state institution. When Mendieta studied English in school, her vocabulary was very limited. In junior high school, she discovered a love for art. Mendieta was first a French major and art minor, but when she transferred to the University of Iowa, she was inspired by the avant-garde community and the hills of Iowa's landscape. She earned a BA (enrolled 1969–1972) and MA in painting, and an MFA (enrolled 1972–1977) in Intermedia under the instruction of acclaimed artist Hans Breder. She faced a great deal of discrimination while in art school. In college, Mendieta's work focused on blood and violence toward women. Her interest in spiritualism, religion, and primitive rituals developed during this time. After graduate school, she moved to New York City.

Work

In the course of her career, Mendieta created works in Cuba, Mexico, Italy, and the United States. Her work was somewhat autobiographical, drawing from her history of being displaced from her native Cuba, and focused on themes including feminism, violence, life, death, identity, place, and belonging. Many of her works included ephemeral outdoor performances and photographs, sculptures and drawings. Her works are generally associated with the four Classical elements. Mendieta often focused on a spiritual and physical connection with the earth. She felt that by uniting her body with the earth she could become whole again: "Through my earth/body sculptures, I become one with the earth ... I become an extension of nature and nature becomes an extension of my body. This obsessive act of reasserting my ties with the earth is really the reactivation of primeval beliefs ... [in] an omnipresent female force, the after image of being encompassing within the womb, is a manifestation of my thirst for being." During her lifetime, Mendieta produced over 200 works of art using earth as a sculptural medium. Her techniques were mainly influenced by Afro-Cuban traditions.

Rape Scene (1973 Moffit Street, Iowa City, Iowa) 
Mendieta's first use of blood to make art was in 1972, when she performed Untitled (Death of a Chicken). In this performance, she stood naked in front of a white wall holding a freshly decapitated chicken by its feet as its blood spattered her naked body. In 1973, Mendieta performed Rape Scene, which commented on the rape and murder of a fellow student that had been committed on the University of Iowa campus by another student.  In the performance, Mendieta invited friends and other students to visit her in her Moffit Street apartment.  Upon arriving at her apartment, viewers were confronted with the image of Mendieta, naked from the waist down, smeared with blood, bent over, and bound to a table. Mendieta recalls that after encountering her body, her audience "all sat down, and started talking about it. I didn’t move. I stayed in position about an hour. It really jolted them" The interaction between the people who stayed to observe and talk about her work (rape scene) and the artist herself (Ana Mendieta) was a means of processing the actual crime that had occurred at the University of Iowa. 

Professor and art historian Kaira Cabañas writes about Untitled (Rape Scene):

Her body was the subject and object of the work. She used it to emphasize the societal conditions by which the female body is colonized as the object of male desire and ravaged under masculine aggression.  Mendieta's corporeal presence demanded the recognition of a female subject. The previously invisible, unnamed victim of rape gained an identity. The audience was forced to reflect on its responsibility; its empathy was elicited and translated to the space of awareness in which sexual violence could be addressed.

In a slide series, People Looking at Blood Moffitt (1973), she poured blood and rags on a sidewalk and photographed people walking by without stopping until the man next door (the storefront window bears the name H.F. Moffitt) came out to clean it up.

Involvement in the A.I.R.
In 1978, Ana Mendieta joined the Artists In Residence Inc (A.I.R. Gallery) in New York, which was the first gallery for women to be established in the United States. The venture gave her the opportunity to network with other women artists at the forefront of the era's feminist movement. During that time, Mendieta was also actively involved in the administration and maintenance of the A.I.R. In an unpublished statement, she noted, "It is crucial for me to be a part of all my art works. As a result of my participation, my vision becomes a reality and part of my experiences." At the same time, after two years of involvement with A.I.R., she concluded that "American Feminism as it stands is basically a white middle class movement," and she sought to challenge the limits of this perspective through her art. She met her future husband Carl Andre at the gallery, when he served on a panel titled "How has women's art practices affected male artist social attitudes?" Her resignation in 1982 is attributed, in part, to a dispute instigated by Andre over a collaborative art piece the couple had submitted. In a 2001 journal article, Kat Griefen, director of A.I.R from 2006 to 2011, wrote, The letter of resignation did not cite any reasons for her departure, but a number of fellow A.I.R. artists remember the related events. For a recent benefit Mendieta and Carl Andre had donated a collaborative piece. As was the policy, all works needed to be delivered by the artist. Edelson recalls that Andre took offense, instigating a disagreement, which, in part, led to Mendieta's resignation. Even without this incident, according to another member, Pat Lasch, Mendieta's association with the now legendary Andre surely played some role in her decision.In 1983, Mendieta was awarded the Rome Prize by the American Academy in Rome. While living in Rome, Mendieta began creating art "objects", including drawings and sculptures. She continued to use natural elements in her work.

Silueta Series (1973–1985)

In her Silueta Series (1973–1985), Mendieta created female silhouettes in nature—in mud, sand, and grass—with natural materials ranging from leaves and twigs to blood, and made body prints or painted her outline or silhouette onto a wall. She did this to express herself becoming part of the earth and to embody a process of rituals (Abby, 2015).

In a 1981 artist statement, Mendieta said: I have been carrying out a dialogue between the landscape and the female body (based on my own silhouette). I believe this has been a direct result of my having been torn from my homeland (Cuba) during my adolescence. I am overwhelmed by the feeling of having been cast from the womb (nature). My art is the way I re-establish the bonds that unite me to the universe. It is a return to the maternal source.
When she began her Silueta Series in the 1970s, Mendieta was one of many artists experimenting with the emerging genres of land art, body art, and performance art. The films and photographs of Siluetas are in connection with the figures surrounding her body. Mendieta was possibly the first to combine these genres in what she called "earth-body" sculptures. She often used her naked body to explore and connect with the Earth, as seen in her piece Imagen de Yagul, from the series Silueta Works, Mexico, 1973–1977. The Silueta Works, Mexico, 1973–1977 series was featured in the group show My Body, My Rules at the Pérez Art Museum Miami between 2020–2021. 

Untitled (Ochún) (1981), named for the Santería goddess of waters, once pointed southward from the shore at Key Biscayne, Florida. Ñañigo Burial (1976), with a title taken from the popular name for an Afro-Cuban religious brotherhood, is a floor installation of black candles dripping wax in the outline of the artist's body. Through these works, which involve performance, film, and photography, Mendieta explored her relationship with a place as well as a larger relationship with Mother Earth or the "Great Goddess" figure.

Mary Jane Jacob suggests in her exhibition catalog Ana Mendieta: The "Silueta" Series (1973–1980) that much of Mendieta's work was influenced by her interest in the religion Santería, as well as a connection to Cuba. Jacob attributes Mendieta's "ritualistic use of blood," and the use of gunpowder, earth, and rock, to Santería's ritualistic traditions.

Jacob also points out the significance of the mother figure, referring to the Mayan deity Ix Chel, the mother of the gods. Many have interpreted Mendieta's recurring use of this mother figure and her own female silhouette as feminist art. However, because Mendieta's work explores many ideas including life, death, identity, and place all at once, it cannot be categorized as part of one idea or movement. Claire Raymond argues that the Silueta Series, as a photographic archive, should be read for its photographicity rather than merely as documentation of earthworks.

In Corazon de Roca con Sangre (Rock Heart with Blood) (1975) Mendieta kneels next to an impression of her body that has been cut into the soft, muddy riverbank.

Photo etchings of the Rupestrian Sculptures (1981) 
As documented in the book Ana Mendieta: A Book of Works (edited by Bonnie Clearwater), before her death, Mendieta was working on a series of photo-etchings of cave sculptures she had created at Escaleras de Jaruco, Jaruco State Park in Havana, Cuba. She had returned to the island as a part of a cultural exchange group and was eager to begin exploring her birthplace after having spent 19 years in exile. The soft limestone and undulating landscapes provided a new scope for Mendieta's art as she began to explore the cultural identity that she had long been forsaken. Her sculptures were entitled Rupestrian Sculptures (1981)—the title refers to living among rocks—and the book of photographic etchings that Mendieta created to preserve these sculptures is a testament to the intertextuality of her work. Clearwater explains that the photographs of Mendieta's sculptures were often as important as the piece they were documenting because the nature of Mendieta's work was so impermanent. She spent as much time and thought on the creation of the photographs as she did on the sculptures themselves.

Although Mendieta returned to Havana for this project, she was still exploring her sense of displacement and loss, according to Clearwater. The Rupestrian Sculptures that Mendieta created were also influenced by the Taíno people, "native inhabitants of the pre-Hispanic Antilles", whom Mendieta became fascinated by and studied.

Mendieta completed five photo-etchings of the Rupestrian Sculptures before she died in 1985. The book Ana Mendieta: A Book of Works, published in 1993, contains both photographs of the sculptures and Mendieta's notes on the project.

Body Tracks (1982)
Body Tracks (Rastros Corporales) debuted on April 8, 1982, in Franklin Furnace in New York City.  The tracks are long, blurry marks made by Mendieta on a large piece of white paper attached to a wall. The marks were made of a mixture of tempera paint and animal blood.

The performance was documented in the 1987 film Ana Mendieta: Fuego de Tierra, and described by scholar Alexandra Gonzenbach: In the short piece, the artist enters the studio space, while Cuban music plays in the background. She dips her hands and forearms into animal blood, places her back to the camera, lifts her arms and places them on a large sheet of white paper attached to a wall, and then proceeds to slowly drag her arms down the page, until almost reaching the bottom. She then walks off screen and out of the performance space. The camera, documentation, and performance stops.The resultant pieces of paper were preserved by Mendieta after the event, and appear in the collection of the Rose Art Museum at Brandeis University.  A still photo from the exhibit was the cover art of the Third Woman Press edition of the feminist anthology This Bridge Called My Back: Writings by Radical Women of Color (2002).

Film works (1971–1980)
In the 1970s, Mendieta made several experimental films. These include:

Creek (1974): This film builds on the Shakespearean character of Ophelia. It was shot in San Felipe Creek, Oaxaca, Mexico. In the film, Mendieta merges with the water.
Chicken Movie, Chicken Piece (1972)
Parachute (1973)
Moffitt Building Piece (1973)
Grass Breathing (1974)
Dog (1974)
Mirage (1974)
Weather Balloon, Feathered Balloon (1974)
Silueta Sangrienta (1975)
Energy Charge (1975)
Ochún (1981): Mendieta filmed Ochun in Key Biscayne, Florida. It is about the Santería goddess, Ochún—the Orisha of the river. It features sand silhouettes, seagull sounds, and ocean waves, and emphasizes themes of longing for another land. It was her last film.
Untitled (1981): "focuses on the outline of a figure Mendieta carved into the shoreline in Guanabo, a beach town in the artist’s home country of Cuba. Derived from Mendieta’s interest in indigenous Caribbean religion, and themes of exile and return, the shape of the female figure would become a common motif in Mendieta’s work by the early 1980s."
Esculturas Rupestres (Rupestrian Sculptures; 1981): "emphasizes the importance of documentation in grasping the full scope of her practice."
Birth (Gunpowder Works; 1981): "features a female silhouette sculpted from wet mud as it sparks and burns out amid the landscape."

In 2016, a traveling exhibition of her film work was mounted by the Katherine E. Nash Gallery of the University of Minnesota with the title Covered in Time and History: The Films of Ana Mendieta.

Film works released posthumously (1985–present)
The Estate of Ana Mendieta Collection, LLC, and family members found several films after her death while looking for work to be included in a retrospective at the New Museum in 1987. In 2016, more films were uncovered and digitized in anticipation of a documentary directed by the artist's niece, Raquel Cecilia Mendieta.

Pain of Cuba/Body I Am (2018)
The Earth That Covers Us Speaks (2018)

Exhibitions
Mendieta presented a solo exhibition of her photographs at A.I.R. Gallery in New York in 1979. She also curated and wrote the introductory catalog essay for an exhibition at A.I.R. in 1981 titled Dialectics of Isolation: An Exhibition of Third World Women Artists of the United States, which featured the work of artists such as Judy Baca, Senga Nengudi, Howardena Pindell, and Zarina. The New Museum of Contemporary Art in New York hosted Mendieta's first survey exhibition in 1987. Since her death, Mendieta has been recognized with international solo museum retrospectives such as Ana Mendieta, Art Institute of Chicago (2011); and Ana Mendieta in Context: Public and Private Work, De La Cruz Collection, Miami (2012). In 2004, the Hirshhorn Museum and Sculpture Garden in Washington, D.C., organized Earth Body, Sculpture and Performance, a major retrospective that traveled to the Whitney Museum of American Art, New York; Des Moines Art Center, Iowa; and Pérez Art Museum Miami, Florida (2004).

In 2017, her work was presented in the retrospective solo show Ana Mendieta / Covered in Time and History at Bildmuseet, Umeå University, Sweden.

In 2019, her work was displayed in the exhibition La Tierra Habla (The Earth Speaks) at Galerie Lelong, NYC, New York.

In 2019-2020, her work was displayed in the Exhibtion Ana Mendieta: Source, at the Galleria Raffaella Cortese

Milan, Italy 

In 2020, her work was displayed in the exhibition, Ana Mendieta: Blood Inside Outside at the Baltimore Museum of Art, in Baltimore, MaryLand

In November 4, 2022 – February 19, 2023, her work was displayed in the exhibtion, Ana Mendieta: Elemental at the Rochester Institute of Technology, City Art Space, in Rochester, NY

Public Collections 
Mendieta's work is featured in many major public collections, including the Solomon R. Guggenheim Museum, Metropolitan Museum of Art, Whitney Museum of American Art, and Museum of Modern Art in New York; the Art Institute of Chicago; Centre Pompidou, Paris; Musée d'Art Moderne et Contemporain, Geneva; Tate Collection, London; the Nasher Sculpture Center, Dallas; and the Pérez Art Museum Miami.

Death and controversy
Ana Mendieta died on September 8, 1985, in New York City, after falling from her 34th-floor apartment in Greenwich Village at 300 Mercer Street. She lived there with her husband of eight months, minimalist sculptor Carl Andre. The circumstances surrounding her death have been the subject of controversy. She fell 33 stories onto the roof of a deli. Just prior to her death, neighbors heard the couple arguing violently. The neighbors heard Mendieta scream out "no" right before her death, and Andre had scratches all over his face. There were no eyewitnesses to the events that led up to Mendieta's death. A recording of Andre's 911 call showed him saying: "My wife is an artist, and I'm an artist, and we had a quarrel about the fact that I was more, eh, exposed to the public than she was. And she went to the bedroom, and I went after her, and she went out the window." During three years of legal proceedings, Andre's lawyer described Mendieta's death as a possible accident or a suicide. After a nonjury trial, Andre was acquitted of second-degree murder in February 1988.

The acquittal caused an uproar among feminists in the art world, and remains controversial. In 2010, a symposium called Where Is Ana Mendieta? was held at New York University to commemorate the 25th anniversary of her death. In May 2014, the feminist protest group No Wave Performance Task Force staged a protest in front of the Dia Art Foundation's retrospective on Carl Andre. The group deposited piles of animal blood and guts in front of the establishment, with protesters donning transparent tracksuits with "I Wish Ana Mendieta Was Still Alive" written on them. In March 2015, the No Wave Performance Task Force and a group of feminist poets from New York City traveled to Beacon, New York, to protest the Andre retrospective at Dia Beacon, where they cried loudly in the main gallery, made "siluetas" in the snow on museum grounds, and stained the snow with paprika, sprinkles, and fake blood. In April 2017, protesters at an Andre retrospective handed out cards at the Geffen Contemporary museum with the statement: "Carl Andre is at MOCA Geffen. ¿Dónde está Ana Mendieta?" (Where is Ana Mendieta?). This was followed by an open letter to Museum of Contemporary Art (MOCA) Director Philippe Vergne protesting the exhibit, from the group the Association of Hysteric Curators.

Legacy
In 2009, Mendieta was awarded a Lifetime Achievement Award by the Cintas Foundation.

In 2010, she was the subject of Richard Move's controversial Where is Ana Mendieta? 25 Years Later - An Exhibition and Symposium, which included his film, BloodWork - The Ana Mendieta Story.

In 2018, The New York Times published a belated obituary for her that began, "Mendieta's art, sometimes violent, often unapologetically feminist and usually raw, left an indelible mark before her life was cut short."

See also
 Ecofeminist art
 Environmental art
 Feminist art movement in the United States
 Land art
 List of unsolved deaths
 Performance art

References

Further reading
 
 Best, Susan, "Ana Mendieta: Affect Miniatiarizatin, Emotional Ties and the Silueta Series," Visualizing Feeling: Affect and the Feminine Avant-Garde (London: I B Tauris, 2011) 92–115 
 
 
 Del Valle, Alejandro (2016). "Ana Mendieta and Fray Ramón Pané: a link between contemporary art and Spanish colonial literature". Laocoonte. Revista de Estética y Teoría de las Artes, 3, 101-120
 Del Valle, Alejandro (2018). "The influences of archaeological ruins of yagul on the art of Ana Mendieta". Arte, Individuo y Sociedad, 30 (1) 127-144
 "Ana Mendieta: Earth Body, Sculpture and Performance 1972–1985." Hirshhorn Museum and Sculpture Garden. Traditional Fine Arts Organization, Inc.
 Ana Mendieta: New Museum archive 
 Cabañas, Kaira M. "Ana Mendieta: 'Pain of Cuba, body I Am.'" Woman's Art Journal 20, no. 1 (1999): 12–17.
 Camhi, Leslie. "ART; Her Body, Herself". The New York Times 2004-06-20.
 Crawford, Marisa. "Crying for Ana Mendieta at the Carl Andre Retrospective." Hyperallergic. 2015
 Gopnik, Blake. "'Silueta' of A Woman: Sizing Up Ana Mendieta." The Washington Post p. N01. 2004-10-17.
 Heartney, Eleanor. "Rediscovering Ana Mendieta." Art in America 92, no. 10 (2004): 139–143.
 Howard, Christopher. "Ana Mendieta: Earth Body, Sculpture and Performance, 1972–1985." Art Book 12, no. 2 (May 2005): 21–22. Art Full Text (H.W. Wilson), EBSCOhost (accessed November 29, 2014).
 Herrera, Gretel. Las huellas de Ana Mendieta. Fundación Cultural Enrique Loynaz, Santo Domingo. (Spanish)
 Katz, Robert. Naked by the Window: The Fatal Marriage of Carl Andre and Ana Mendieta. Atlantic Monthly Press, 1990.
 Kwon, Miwon. "Bloody Valentines: Afterimages by Ana Mendieta." In: Catherine de Zegher (ed.), Inside the Visible. The Institute of Contemporary Art, Boston & MIT Press, 1996.
 "Making Sense of Modern Art" The San Francisco Museum of Modern Art.
 Moure, Gloria et al. Ana Mendieta. Poligrafa, April 2, 2001.
 Oransky, Howard, Covered in Time and History: The Films of Ana Mendieta, University of California Press, 2015 
 Patrick, Vincent. "A Death in the Art World." The New York Times 1990-06-10. p. 428. 
 Perreault, John and Petra Barreras del Rio. Ana Mendieta: A Retrospective. The New Museum of Contemporary Art, New York, 1987.
 Raine, Anne. "Embodied Geographies: Subjectivity and Materiality in the Work of Ana Mendieta." In Feminist Approaches to Theory and Methodology: An Interdisciplinary Reader, edited by Sharlene Hesse-Biber, Christina Gilmartin, and Robin Lydenberg, 259–286. New York: Oxford University Press, 1999.
 Rauch, Heidi, and Federico Suro. "Ana Mendieta's Primal Scream." Américas 44, no.5 (1992): 44–48.
 Szymanek, Angelique. "Bloody Pleasures: Ana Mendieta's Violent Tableaux," Signs: Journal of Women in Culture and Society 41, no. 4 (Summer 2016): 895–925
 Viso, Olga. Ana Mendieta: Earth Body. Hatje Cantz in collaboration with the Hirshhorn Museum and Sculpture Garden, 2004.
 Viso, Olga. Unseen Mendieta: The Unpublished Works of Ana Mendieta. New York: Prestel, 2008.
 Walker, Joanna, "The body is present even if in disguise: tracing the trace in the art work of Nancy Spero and Ana Mendieta". Tate Papers, Spring 2009.
 Ana Mendieta Exhibition at Fundació Antoni Tàpies
 Redfern, Christine et al. Who is Ana Mendieta? Feminist Press, 2011.

1948 births
1985 deaths
20th-century American women artists
American feminists
American people of Cuban descent
Cuban contemporary artists
Cuban feminists
Deaths by defenestration
Exiles of the Cuban Revolution in the United States
Feminist artists
Hispanic and Latino American artists
Hispanic and Latino American women in the arts
People from Havana
Unsolved deaths in the United States
Hispanic and Latino American feminists